Pär Johan Millqvist (born 24 May 1967) is a Swedish former footballer who played as a right-back.

Club career 
Millqvist represented Djurgårdens IF, IFK Göteborg, Örebro SK, Vasalunds IF, AIK, and IF Brommapojkarna during a career that spanned between 1986 and 1999. While at IFK Göteborg, he was a part of the Göteborg team that was crowned Swedish Champions in 1987.

He is best remembered for his time at AIK, with which he won one Allsvenskan title and two Svenska Cupen titles. He was also a part of the AIK team that reached the quarterfinals of the 1996–97 UEFA Cup Winners' Cup before being eliminated by FC Barcelona.

International career 
Millqvist represented the Sweden U21 team twice between 1986 and 1987.

Honours 
IFK Göteborg

 Swedish Champion: 1987

AIK

 Allsvenskan: 1998
 Svenska Cupen: 1995–96, 1996–97

References 

1967 births
Living people
Swedish footballers
Allsvenskan players
Association football defenders
IF Brommapojkarna players
People from Solna Municipality
AIK Fotboll players
Örebro SK players
IFK Göteborg players
Sweden under-21 international footballers
Vasalunds IF players
Djurgårdens IF Fotboll players
Sportspeople from Stockholm County